Mary Maher may refer to:
 Mary Cecilia Maher, New Zealand religious sister, teacher, and social worker
 Mary Hellen Maher, American librarian
 Mary Maher (journalist), Irish journalist, trade unionist and feminist